Death Row: The Lost Sessions Vol. 1 is a compilation of outtakes Snoop Dogg recorded between 1993 and 1997 on Death Row Records.

Four tracks were produced by Dr. Dre. The others were produced by other producers including Daz Dillinger, Soopafly and LT Hutton. The track "Doggystyle" had been intended as the title track for Snoop's first album, Doggystyle, in 1993, but was left off the album. The track has vocals by George Clinton. The album was released twice in 2009 as a CD by WIDEawake Records. Tracks 16 to 18 are exclusive tracks for the second CD release. The album reached number 22 on the Billboard Top R&B/Hip-Hop Albums in the US.

Track listing

Personnel
 Paul Schultz – artwork
 WIDEawake/Deathrow Entertainment – executive producer
 Brian "Big Bass" Gardner – master recording
 John Hyland – album sequencing, liner notes
 Justin "Coyote" Burdick – record mixer
 Daz Dillinger – producer (tracks: 5, 6, 8)
 Dr. Dre – producer (tracks: 2, 3, 4, 15)
 L.T. Hutton – producer (tracks: 9, 10, 18)
 Soopafly – producer (tracks: 7, 8, 16, 17)
 Snoop Doggy Dogg – producer (track: 8)
 Other producers (tracks: 1, 11 to 14)

References

Snoop Dogg compilation albums
2009 compilation albums
Death Row Records compilation albums
Albums produced by Dr. Dre
Albums produced by L.T. Hutton
Albums produced by Soopafly
Gangsta rap compilation albums
G-funk compilation albums